The Petroleum Safety Authority Norway (PSA) is a Norwegian governmental supervisory authority under the Norwegian Ministry of Labour and Social Inclusion. The PSA has regulatory responsibility for safety, emergency preparedness and the working environment in petroleum-industry activities in Norway, both on land and offshore. The director is Magne Ognedal.

The PSA was established on 1 January 2004 as an independent, governmental supervisory body, partitioned from the Norwegian Petroleum Directorate. Its headquarters are located in Stavanger.

Responsibilities
The PSA has regulatory responsibility for safety, emergency preparedness and the working environment in the petroleum activities, including petroleum facilities and associated pipeline systems at Melkøya, Tjeldbergodden, Nyhamna, Kollsnes, Mongstad, Sture, Kårstø and Slagentangen, as well as any future, integrated petroleum facilities.

The regulatory responsibility covers all phases of the activities; such as planning, engineering, construction, use and finally, removal.

The Norwegian government has assigned the Petroleum Safety Authority Norway the following tasks: 
The PSA shall, through its own supervision and through cooperation with other authorities in the HSE area, ensure that the petroleum activities and other associated activities are followed up in a comprehensive manner. 
The PSA shall furthermore carry out information and advisory activities vis-à-vis the players in the industry, establish practical cooperative relationships with other national and international HSE authorities, as well as contribute actively to the transfer of knowledge in the area of health, safety and environment in society in general. 
The PSA shall issue statements to its superior government ministry regarding matters which are under consideration and provide assistance to the ministry when requested.

In the broadest sense, the entire work and purpose of the Petroleum Safety Authority Norway is to ensure that the petroleum activities are conducted prudently as regards health, environment and safety. The ministry has issued the following guidelines for how the PSA should carry out its tasks:

Follow-up shall be system-oriented and risk-based. This follow-up must be in addition to, and not instead of, the follow-up which the industry carries out for its own part. There shall be a balanced consideration between the PSA's role as a high risk/technological supervisory body and as a labour inspection authority. Participation and cooperation between the parties are important principles and integral preconditions for the activities of the Petroleum Safety Authority Norway.

Activities
In 2005, the PSA was made part of the Coexistence Group II working group, a joint project of the Norwegian government, the Institute of Marine Research, the Norwegian Fishermen's Association, the Norwegian Foundation for Nature Research and the Norwegian Oil Industry Association. Coexistence Group II's mission is to explore the feasibility of coexistence between the fishing and petroleum industries in Norwegian waters. The PSA also coordinates supervisory responsibility with Norway's national Health Examination Survey (HES).

See also
History of the petroleum industry in Norway
Standardization in oil industry

References

External links

Official Petroleum Safety Authority Norway website—

Government agencies of Norway
Petroleum industry in Norway
Oil and gas law
Petroleum politics
Government agencies established in 2004
2004 establishments in Norway
Petroleum in Norway
Safety organizations
Energy organizations